Armand Magyar (5 February 1898 – 12 February 1961) was a Hungarian wrestler. He competed in the Greco-Roman bantamweight at the 1924 Summer Olympics.

References

External links
 

1898 births
1961 deaths
Olympic wrestlers of Hungary
Wrestlers at the 1924 Summer Olympics
Hungarian male sport wrestlers
Martial artists from Budapest
20th-century Hungarian people